Gohitafla is a town in central Ivory Coast. It is a sub-prefecture and commune of Zuénoula Department in Marahoué Region, Sassandra-Marahoué District.

In 2014, the population of the sub-prefecture of Gohitafla was 35,440.

Villages
The 19 villages of the sub-prefecture of Gohitafla and their population in 2014 are:

Notes

Sub-prefectures of Marahoué
Communes of Marahoué